Aloeides caledoni, the Caledon copper, is a species of butterfly in the family Lycaenidae. It is endemic to South Africa, where it has a wide range but is very rare and localised in the Western Cape.

Adults are on wing from August to November. There is one generation per year.

References

Aloeides
Butterflies described in 1973
Endemic butterflies of South Africa
Taxonomy articles created by Polbot